Swiss steak is a dish of meat, usually beef, that is  swissed by rolling or pounding before being braised in a cooking pot of stewed vegetables and seasonings. It is often served with gravy. It is made either on a stove or in an oven, and does not get its name from Switzerland, as the name suggests, but the technique of tenderizing by pounding or rolling called "swissing".

See also 
 Salisbury steak
 Smothering (food)

References

Beef steak dishes
American meat dishes